The 1981 East Tennessee State Buccaneers football team was an American football team that represented East Tennessee State University as a member of the Southern Conference (SoCon) during the 1981 NCAA Division I-A football season. Led by fourth-year head coach Jack Carlisle, the Buccaneers compiled and overall record of 6–5 with a mark of 4–2 in conference play, placing third in the SoCon.

Schedule

Roster

References

East Tennessee State
East Tennessee State Buccaneers football seasons
East Tennessee State Buccaneers football